Brooklyn Soda Works is a small-scale artisanal craft soda company based in Brooklyn, New York owned by Caroline Mak and Antonio Ramos.

History
The company operates out of a commercial kitchen in Bedford-Stuyvesant section of Brooklyn. The drinks are carried by food restaurants such as the Blue Hill Restaurant in Manhattan.

Beverage flavors

The company offers different flavors based on their experimentation, such as cucumber lime sea salt, and watermelon tarragon lemon.

References

External links

Carbonated drinks
Companies based in Brooklyn
Food production companies based in New York City